The Minneapolis Marathon was a marathon held in late May or early June in Minneapolis, Minnesota. The first race was held in 2009. In addition to the marathon, there was also half-marathon and 5K run. The course had sections of flats and hills. Most of the course followed the Mississippi Riverfront. The race was not held after 2015.

Past winners
Key:

See also
Twin Cities Marathon
Grandma's Marathon

Marathons in the United States
Sports in Minneapolis–Saint Paul
Foot races in Minnesota